The SPIKE algorithm is a hybrid parallel solver for banded linear systems developed by Eric Polizzi and Ahmed Sameh

Overview
It is divided into a preprocessing stage and a postprocessing stage.

Preprocessing stage
In the preprocessing stage, the linear system  is partitioned into a block tridiagonal form

Assume, for the time being, that the diagonal blocks  ( with ) are nonsingular. Define a block diagonal matrix
,
then  is also nonsingular. Left-multiplying  to both sides of the system gives

which is to be solved in the postprocessing stage.

These columns are called the spikes.

Postprocessing stage
Without loss of generality, assume that each spike contains exactly  columns ( is much less than ) (pad the spike with columns of zeroes if necessary). Partition the spikes in all  and  into

 and 

Partition similarly all  and  into

 and 

Notice that the system produced by the preprocessing stage can be reduced to a block pentadiagonal system of much smaller size (recall that  is much less than )

SPIKE as a polyalgorithmic banded linear system solver
Despite being logically divided into two stages, computationally, the SPIKE algorithm comprises three stages:
 factorizing the diagonal blocks,
 computing the spikes,
 solving the reduced system.
Each of these stages can be accomplished in several ways, allowing a multitude of variants. Two notable variants are the recursive SPIKE algorithm for non-diagonally-dominant cases and the truncated SPIKE algorithm for diagonally-dominant cases. Depending on the variant, a system can be solved either exactly or approximately. In the latter case, SPIKE is used as a preconditioner for iterative schemes like Krylov subspace methods and iterative refinement.

Recursive SPIKE

Preprocessing stage
The first step of the preprocessing stage is to factorize the diagonal blocks . For numerical stability, one can use LAPACK's XGBTRF routines to LU factorize them with partial pivoting. Alternatively, one can also factorize them without partial pivoting but with a "diagonal boosting" strategy. The latter method tackles the issue of singular diagonal blocks.

In concrete terms, the diagonal boosting strategy is as follows. Let  denote a configurable "machine zero". In each step of LU factorization, we require that the pivot satisfy the condition

.

If the pivot does not satisfy the condition, it is then boosted by

where  is a positive parameter depending on the machine's unit roundoff, and the factorization continues with the boosted pivot. This can be achieved by modified versions of ScaLAPACK's XDBTRF routines. After the diagonal blocks are factorized, the spikes are computed and passed on to the postprocessing stage.

Postprocessing stage

The two-partition case
In the two-partition case, i.e., when , the reduced system  has the form

An even smaller system can be extracted from the center:

which can be solved using the block LU factorization

,
.

The multiple-partition case
Assume that  is a power of two, i.e., . Consider a block diagonal matrix

where

Now we factorize  as

.

The new matrix  has the form

and

.

Such factorization steps can be performed recursively. After  steps, we obtain the factorization

,

where  has only two spikes. The reduced system will then be solved via

.

Generalization to cases where  is not a power of two is almost trivial.

Truncated SPIKE
When  is diagonally-dominant, in the reduced system

With them omitted, the reduced system becomes block diagonal

and can be easily solved in parallel .

The truncated SPIKE algorithm can be wrapped inside some outer iterative scheme (e.g., BiCGSTAB or iterative refinement) to improve the accuracy of the solution.

SPIKE for tridiagonal systems
A version of the algorithm, termed g-Spike, that is based on serial Givens rotations applied independently on each block was designed for the NVIDIA GPU .

SPIKE as a preconditioner
The SPIKE algorithm can also function as a preconditioner for iterative methods for solving linear systems.

In order for the preconditioner to be effective, row and/or column permutation is usually necessary to move "heavy" elements of  close to the diagonal so that they are covered by the preconditioner.

The SPIKE algorithm can be generalized by not restricting the preconditioner to be strictly banded. In particular, the diagonal block in each partition can be a general matrix and thus handled by a direct general linear system solver rather than a banded solver. This enhances the preconditioner, and hence allows better chance of convergence and reduces the number of iterations.

Implementations
Intel offers an implementation of the SPIKE algorithm under the name Intel Adaptive Spike-Based Solver . Tridiagonal solvers have also been developed for the NVIDIA GPU 
 and the Xeon Phi co-processors. The Givens rotations based solver was also implemented for the 
GPU and the Intel Xeon Phi.

References

Further reading
 

Numerical linear algebra